Megalopyge apicalis is a moth of the Megalopygidae family. It was described by Gottlieb August Wilhelm Herrich-Schäffer in 1856.

References

Moths described in 1856
Megalopygidae